Lake Ranau is a Pleistocene volcanic crater lake in Sumatra, Indonesia.

See also
 List of lakes of Indonesia

Notes 

Ranau
Ranau
Ranau
Ranau